El Castillo de los Monstruos may refer to the following films:

 El castillo de los monstruos (1958 film), a 1958 horror film
 El castillo de los monstruos (1964 film), a 1964 horror film